Milford Township is one of twenty-six townships in Iroquois County, Illinois, USA.  As of the 2010 census, its population was 1,659 and it contained 819 housing units.

Geography

Cities, towns, villages
 Milford

Unincorporated towns
 Bryce at 
(This list is based on USGS data and may include former settlements.)

Cemeteries
The township contains these three cemeteries: Maple Grove, Old Milford and Vennum.

Major highways
  Illinois Route 1

Airports and landing strips
 Milford Airport

Demographics

Political districts
 Illinois' 15th congressional district
 State House District 105
 State Senate District 53

References
 
 United States Census Bureau 2007 TIGER/Line Shapefiles
 United States National Atlas

External links
 City-Data.com
 Illinois State Archives

Townships in Iroquois County, Illinois
Townships in Illinois